Sirius is the brightest star in the Earth's night sky.

Sirius may also refer to:

Businesses and organisations
 SES Sirius, a Scandinavian satellite operator
 Sirius (satellite), a constellation of communications satellites
 Sirius-Aero, a Russian airline
 Sirius College, a school network established by Turkish Australians
 Sirius Corporation Ltd, a British open-source software services company
 Sirius Entertainment, an American comic book publisher
 Sirius Minerals, a British fertilizer development company
 Sirius Real Estate, a property company investing in German business parks
 Sirius Software, a 1980s video game publisher
 Sirius Systems Technology, American computer manufacturer of the Sirius 1 in 1981
 Sirius XM, an American broadcasting company
 Sirius Satellite Radio, a former satellite radio service
Sirius Canada
 List of Sirius XM Radio channels

Places
 Sirius Cliffs, in Antarctica
 Sirius Islands, in Antarctica
 Sirius Knoll, in Antarctica
 Mount Sirius, in Antarctica
 Sirius building, an apartment complex in Sydney, Australia
 Sirius (urban-type settlement), in Russia

Science and technology
 Sirius (synchrotron light source), at the Laboratório Nacional de Luz Síncrotron in Brazil
 Eclipse Sirius, an open-source software project 
 Ferranti Sirius, a 1961 small business computer
 Sirius visualization software, software for modeling molecules
 Scientific International Research in Unique Terrestrial Station, a series of spaceflight experiments

Arts and entertainment

Fictional entities

 Sirius (dog), a mythological companion of Orion according to Homer
 Sirius, the eponymous character of Sirius (novel), by Olaf Stapledon, 1944
 Sirius (Re:Zero), a character in the light novel series Re:Zero − Starting Life in Another World 
 Sirius, in video game Bomberman 64
 Sirius, in the novel Planet of the Apes
 Sirius, a planet in video game Serious Sam 2
 Sirius Amory, in The Amory Wars series
 Sirius Black, in the Harry Potter series 
 Sirius Cybernetics Corporation, a company in The Hitchhiker's Guide to the Galaxy
 R.U. Sirius, a space station in the Brewster Rockit: Space Guy! comic strip

Film
 Sirius (1975 film), a Czechoslovak war drama film
 Sirius (2013 film), a documentary film

Music
Sirius (Coleman Hawkins album), 1974
Sirius (Clannad album), 1987
"Sirius" (song), a 1982 instrumental by the Alan Parsons Project
Sirius (Stockhausen), a composition by Karlheinz Stockhausen
Sirius, a 2015 mini album by Daizystripper
"Sirius", a song by Bump of Chicken from the 2019 album Aurora Arc
"Sirius", a song by Diaura from the 2013 album Focus
"Sirius", a song by Eir Aoi
"Sirius", a song by Mike Oldfield from the 2002 album Tr3s Lunas
 Quasimidi Sirius, a music synthesizer

Other uses in arts and entertainment
 Sirius the Jaeger, an anime TV series
 Sirius: The Dog Star, a 2004 anthology of short stories
 Beatmania IIDX 17: Sirius, a 2009 video game
 Sirius (novel), a 1944 novel by Olaf Stapledon

Transport

Ships
 HMAS Sirius (O 266), a Royal Australian Navy tanker
 HMS Sirius, the name of several Royal Navy ships
 MV Sirius, a Greenpeace ship
 NB Sirius, a narrowboat conversion design
 RFA Sirius (A345), a Royal Fleet Auxiliary tanker, launched as SS Empire Faun
 SS Sirius, the name of several steamships
 , the name of several US Navy ships
 USNS Sirius (T-AFS-8), a US Navy support ship
 , a German fishing trawler in service 1926–29

Other uses in transport
Sirius 20, a Canadian sailboat design
Sirius 21, a Canadian sailboat design
Sirius 22, a Canadian sailboat design
Sirius 26, a Canadian sailboat design
Sirius 28, a Canadian sailboat design
Alpaero Sirius, or Noin Siriua, a French motor glider
Lockheed Model 8 Sirius, a 1929 monoplane
Mitsubishi Sirius engine, an automobile engine

Other uses
 Sirius (wine), produced by Sean Thackrey
 Sirius Dog Sled Patrol, a Danish naval unit
 List of IK Sirius sections, Swedish sports clubs
 R. U. Sirius (Ken Goffman, born 1952), an American writer

See also

 Sirius B (disambiguation)